Iris tenax is a species of Iris, known by the common names tough-leaved iris, Oregon iris, or more colloquially, flag.

Distribution
It is native to southwestern Washington, western Oregon, and northwestern California. It occurs along roadsides and in grasslands and forest openings at low to middle elevations. The subspecies Iris tenax ssp. klamathensis is endemic to northern California in the Klamath Mountains.

Description
Like many irises, Iris tenax has large and showy flowers. The flowers bloom in mid to late spring and are usually lavender-blue to purple, but blooms in white, yellow, pink, and orchid shades are known to sometimes occur.

The leaves are very slender for an iris, seldom over 5 mm broad; the plant is often mistaken for a type of grass when not in bloom. Its rhizomes spread slowly, causing the plant to grow in a tight clump.

Its species name (tenax) means "tough" or "tenacious" and is in reference to the strong, fibrous leaves of the plant, which were used by indigenous peoples for braiding into snares and other cordage.

References

Hitchcock, Charles Leo and Cronquist, Arthur. Flora of the Pacific Northwest. University of Washington Press, .
Kozloff, Eugene N. Plants and Animals of the Pacific Northwest. .
Pojar, Jim and MacKinnon, Andy. Plants of Coastal British Columbia. Lone Pine Publishing, .

External links
Calflora Database: Iris tenax (toughleaf iris)

tenax
Flora of British Columbia
Flora of California
Flora of Oregon
Flora of Washington (state)
Flora of the Klamath Mountains
Flora without expected TNC conservation status